Mark Edward Ettles (born 30 October 1966) is an Australian former baseball pitcher who played for the San Diego Padres in 1993. He was a member of the Australia national baseball team, that ended up in sixth place at the 2000 Summer Olympics in Sydney, Australia.

See also
List of players from Australia in Major League Baseball

Sources

1966 births
Australian expatriate baseball players in the United States
Living people
Major League Baseball players from Australia
San Diego Padres players
Major League Baseball pitchers
Sportspeople from Perth, Western Australia
Chiayi-Tainan Luka players
Taichung Agan players
Baseball players at the 2000 Summer Olympics
Olympic baseball players of Australia
People educated at Wesley College, Perth
Somerset Patriots players
West Florida Argonauts baseball players
Baseball people from Western Australia
Australian expatriate baseball players in Taiwan
Arizona League Padres players
Charleston Rainbows players
Chinatrust Whales players
Fayetteville Generals players
Lakeland Tigers players
Las Vegas Stars (baseball) players
Niagara Falls Rapids players
Rancho Cucamonga Quakes players
Waterloo Diamonds players
Wichita Wranglers players